Disserth and Trecoed is an electoral ward and community in central Powys, Wales (the historic county of Radnorshire). It has a population of 1,239 according to the 2011 UK census.

It is a rural area and includes the settlements of Howey and Crossway and the Caerwnon Park retirement park. It is located to the south of Llandrindod Wells and a few miles to the north of Builth Wells.

The dispersed village of Disserth has a Grade I listed church, St Cewydd's, which dates from the medieval period.  It has an unrestored interior with box pews, dating from the 17th and 18th centuries.

Governance
Disserth and Trecoed has a community council with seven elected community councillors.

The Disserth and Trecoed ward elects a county councillor to Powys County Council. Since 1995 it has been represented by Labour, an Independent, the Liberal Democrats and the Conservative Party.

References

Wards of Powys
Communities in Powys